Talal al-Barazi (born 1963) is a Syrian businessman and politician. He was Internal Trade and Consumer Protection Minister from 11 May 2020 to 31 July 2021 in the Imad Khamis government and First Hussein Arnous government.

References 

1963 births
Living people
21st-century Syrian politicians
Syrian ministers of internal trade
Damascus University alumni

Syrian Kurdish people
Syrian Kurdish politicians
Syrian Sunni Muslims
Syrian businesspeople
Syrian oligarchs